Floating (released October 3, 2005 in Oslo, Norway on the label EmArcy - ) is an album by the Norwegian pianist Ketil Bjørnstad.

Review 
For the first time in his rich and multifaceted career Bjørnstad give us an album with a trio constellation. He has a strong relationship to the melody and the melody to him. We have through some 30 years had the pleasure to witness this mutual love affair, and it has in no way diminished. Here we encounter melody and Bjørnstad in a new constellation and both thrive. Even though this is the first meeting between the three, there are large doses of empathy present and that they have a lot to talk about.

Reception 
The Gemm review awarded the album 4 stars.

Track listing 
«Floating» (6:43)
«The Sorrow In Her Eyes» (5:01)
«Memory» (3:03)
«Ray Of Light» (6:52)
«Looking Back» (2:25)
«Caravan Moving» (2:55)
«Thought» (2:23)
«The Woman On The Pier» (5:06)
«Undercurrent» (3:54)
«The Rainbow» (4:06)
«The Course» (6:39)
«Her Singing» (3:41)
«The Face» (5:13)
«As You Always Said (To Rolf)» (3:58)
«The Waiting Room» (3:02)
«Floating (Epilogue)» (2:43)

Personnel 
Ketil Bjørnstad - piano
Palle Danielsson - double bass
Marilyn Mazur - drums

Credits 
Composer & producer – Ketil Bjørnstad
Liner notes – Ketil Bjørnstad
Recorded and mastered in Rainbow Studio, Oslo, Norway, May/June 2005

Notes 
℗ & © 2005 Universal Music AS, Norway

References

External links 
 Ketil Bjørnstad Official Website

2005 albums
Ketil Bjørnstad albums
EmArcy Records albums
Universal Music Group albums